Liquid Air was the marque of an automobile planned by Liquid Air Power and Automobile Co. of Boston and New York City  in 1899.

A factory location was acquired in Boston, Massachusetts in 1899 and Liquid Air claimed they would construct a car that would run a hundred miles on liquid air. In 1901 an automobile was demonstrated by its designer, Hans Knudsen, at a show in London. This automobile was a modified Locomobile steamer. In 1901 the company had gone into receivership with declared capital stock of $1,500,000 but assets of only $7,500.

See also 
Alternative fuel vehicle
Compressed-air vehicle
Liquid nitrogen vehicle

References 

Defunct motor vehicle manufacturers of the United States
Alternative fuels

Veteran vehicles
1900s cars
Vehicle manufacturing companies established in 1899
Vehicle manufacturing companies disestablished in 1901
Motor vehicle manufacturers based in Massachusetts
Motor vehicle manufacturers based in New York (state)